Dwayne Ijames (born December 4, 1983 in Albany, New York) is a former American football defensive back. He was raised in Pickensville, Alabama and Winston-Salem, North Carolina. He was signed by the Cleveland Browns as an undrafted free agent in 2006. He played college football at Elon University.

Ijames has also been a member of the Laredo Lobos and Corpus Christi Sharks.

Professional career

Cleveland Browns
Ijames was originally signed by the Browns as an undrafted free agent out of Elon.
 However, Ijames was waived by the team after rookie camp.

Laredo Lobos
In 2007, Ijames signed with the Laredo Lobos, an AF2 or Arena Football 2 expansion team in Laredo, Texas.  While playing with the Lobos, Dwayne played in 11 games and was the team leader in tackles and interceptions.  Ijames finished with 55 tackles 6 interceptions 1 forced fumble 1 fumble recovery and 11 pass break-ups.

Corpus Christi Sharks
In 2008, Ijames signed with the Corpus Christi Sharks in Corpus Christi, Texas.  Ijames played in 15 games and was the team leader in interceptions.  Ijmaes finished with 65 tackles 1 tackle for loss 1 forced fumble 2 fumble recoveries 12 pass break-ups and 7 interception, 1 for a touchdown.

References

External links

1983 births
Living people
People from Pickensville, Alabama
Players of American football from Winston-Salem, North Carolina
American football defensive backs
Elon Phoenix football players
Cleveland Browns players
Laredo Lobos players
Corpus Christi Sharks players